The Privy Council Office (PCO) provides secretariat and administrative support to the Lord President of the Council in his or her capacity as president of His Majesty's Most Honourable Privy Council. The head of the office is the Clerk of the Privy Council. The PCO is an independent unit based in the Cabinet Office.

References

External links
Work of the Privy Council Office (Privy Council website)
 of the Privy Council
Archive of 2003 Privy Council Office web page

Ministry of Justice (United Kingdom)
Privy Council of the United Kingdom
Cabinet Office (United Kingdom)